1,1,1-Trichloroacetone is a chlorinated analogue of acetone with the chemical formula CH3COCCl3. It is a colourless liquid. 1,1,1-Trichloroacetone can be synthesised from chlorination of chloroacetone (1,1,3-trichloroacetone is formed as a by-product). An alternative synthesis involves the transfer of a trichloromethyl group from trichloroacetate onto acetyl chloride.

See also 
 Chloroacetone
 1,3-Dichloroacetone
 Hexachloroacetone

References 

Trichloromethyl compounds
Ketones